Negro is a historic term for people of black African ancestry or appearance.

Negro may also refer to:

Places
 Negro Butte, California, US
 Rio Negro (disambiguation), various rivers and other entities, including those named Negro River
 Negro Creek (disambiguation)
 Negro Hill, Antarctica
 Negro Lakes, a lake in Wisconsin, US
 Negro Mountain, Pennsylvania and Maryland, United States
 Negro Run (disambiguation)
 Negro Wash, a stream in Arizona, US

People
Negro (surname)

Stage name or nickname

 A Negro, BA. pen name of Christian Cole (barrister) (1852 – 1885)
 Negro Piñera (born 1954), real name Miguel Piñera, Chilean celebrity
 J. Walter Negro (born 1956), artist and musician better known as Ali
 Negro Casas (born 1960), Mexican wrestler
 Abismo Negro (Black abyss) (1971–2009), Mexican wrestler
 Joey Negro ( born 1964), stage name of Dave Lee, British DJ and producer
 Sin Cara Negro (born 1977), wrestler and archenemy of the original Sin Cara
 Mini Abismo Negro (born 1978), Mexican wrestler

Arts and entertainment
 The Negro (film), a 2002 Canadian drama film by Robert Morin
 "Negro", a song by J Balvin from Colores, 2020

Nonfiction 
The Negro, a 1915 history by W. E. B. Du Bois
Negro Anthology, a 1934 anthology edited by Nancy Cunard

Other uses
, three ships of this name
Negro (candy), a Hungarian brand of confectionery
Negro (lead pencil), an artist's drawing medium
Negro (typeface), a typeface by Lucian Bernhard

See also
Del Negro, a surname
El Negro (disambiguation), nickname of several people
Rio Negro (disambiguation)
Negros (disambiguation)

Black (Negro in Spanish)